Muhammad or Mohammad Sarwar may refer to:

Chaudhry Muhammad Sarwar Khan (1919–2003), longest serving parliamentarian of Pakistan
Mohammad Sarwar (politician) (born 1952), British and Pakistani politician
Mohammed Sarwar (footballer), Afghan footballer
Mohammad Sarwar Ahmadzai (born 1971), Afghan politician
Mohammad Sarwar Danish (born 1961), Afghan politician
Muhammad Sarwar Khan (born 1942), Balochistan politician
Muhammad Shahid Sarwar (born 1952), Pakistani Colonel
Raja Muhammad Sarwar (1910–1948), captain of the Pakistani Army
Muhammad Shaykh Sarwar, Islamic scholar
Mohammad Sarwar (cricketer) (born 1995), Pakistani cricketer
Muhammad Sarwar (field hockey) (born 1975), Pakistani field hockey player